The Late Paddy MacDee Show replaced Northern Nights on BBC Radio Newcastle in the early summer of 2004. It ran from 10pm until 1am every weeknight until late 2018 - playing his own selection of music alongside features and local bands and musicians.

Paddy MacDee presented a show on Sundays between 6pm and 10pm, playing hits from the 1960s and 1970s. The show was previously broadcast 5-7pm.

References

BBC Local Radio programmes
BBC Local Radio
Newcastle upon Tyne
2004 radio programme debuts